The action of 2 May 1654 was a sea battle which took place near Colombo, Ceylon, when a force of 11 Dutch ships defeated 3 Portuguese galleons, which ran aground and were burnt near Carmona, north of Cabo de Rama. On about 4 May Zijdeworm was burnt as a fireship near Karwar, and on 6 May the Portuguese galleon Nazareth was burnt near Hanovar. This removed a significant proportion of Portuguese ships in the Indian Ocean area.

Ships involved

Netherlands
Avenhoorn 30-40
Sluys 30-40
Cabeljauw 30-40
Hulst 30-40
Saphier 30-40
Konijn 30-40
Gecroonde Leeuw 30-40 (same as Roode Leuw?)
Muyden 30-40
Weesp 38
Popkensburch 30-40
Zijdeworm 30-40

The first 7 ships dealt with Santo António de Mazagão and the rest with São João Pérola.

Portugal
Santo António de Mazagão 36 (António Sottomaior) - Aground and burnt
São João Pérola 38 (António de Abreu??) - Aground and burnt
Nazaré 42

Guns are also given as around 28–30 each.

References 

1654
Action of 1654-05-02
Naval battles involving Portugal
1654 in Asia
Conflicts in 1654
1654 in the Dutch Empire
1654 in the Portuguese Empire